Bodawpaya (11 March 1745 – 5 June 1819) was the sixth king of the Konbaung dynasty of Burma. Born Maung Shwe Waing and later Badon Min, he was the fourth son of Alaungpaya, founder of the dynasty and the Third Burmese Empire. He was proclaimed king after deposing his nephew Phaungkaza Maung Maung, son of his eldest brother Naungdawgyi, at Ava. Bodawpaya moved the royal capital back to Amarapura in 1782. He was titled Hsinbyumyashin, not to be confused with his older brother Hsinbyushin. However, he became known to posterity as Bodawpaya (Grandsire) in relation to his successor, his grandson Bagyidaw (Royal Elder Uncle), who in turn was given this name in relation to his nephew Mindon Min. He fathered 70 sons and 67 daughters by about 54 consorts.

Military expeditions

Also known as Bodaw U Waing, he invaded Arakan in 1784 sending his royal armies led by his son, the Heir Apparent Thado Minsaw, across the Western Yoma range of mountains. The capital of Arakan Mrauk U was captured on the last of 1784. The Mahamuni Buddha image, among other treasures such as the Khmer bronze statues, were brought back to mainland Burma; these can still be seen in Mandalay. Also taken were 20,000 captives as slaves to pagodas and temples, and the nobility at Amarapura. Once Arakan was annexed as a province of Burma, her borders became contiguous with British India. The Arakanese revolted in 1794, and the British Governor of India Sir John Shore (later Lord Teignmouth) sent Captain Michael Symes on an embassy, fully equipped to gather as much information as possible about the country, to the Court of Ava as the kingdom was still known to the outside world. 

Bodawpaya invaded Siam in 1785, and was defeated. The Governor of Tavoy revolted in 1791 with the aid of the Siamese, but a punitive expedition sent by Bodawpaya by sea laid siege ending in peace negotiations in 1793 and the ceding of the Tenasserim coast to the Burmese. He invaded Siam again in 1809, but was fended off by Maha Senanurak. The Burmese loss of Lan Na during the failed invasion proved to be the end of their 200-year rule.

In 1816, the Ahom governor of Guwahati in Assam, Badan Chandra Borphukan visited the court of Bodawpaya to seek help in order to defeat his political rival Purnananda Burhagohain, the Prime Minister of Ahom Kingdom in Assam. A strong force of 16,000 under the command of Gen. Maha Minhla Minkhaung was sent with Badan Chandra Borphukan. The Burmese force entered Assam in January, 1817 and defeated the Assamese force in the battle of Ghiladhari. Meanwhile, Purnananda Burhagohain died, and Ruchinath Burhagohain, the son of Purnananda Burahgohain fled to Guwahati. The reigning Ahom king Chandrakanta Singha came in terms with Badan Chandra Borphukan and his Burmese allies. The King appointed Badan Chandra Borphukan as Mantri Phukan (Prime Minister) and an Ahom princess Hemo Aideo was given for marriage to Burmese King Bodawpaya along with many gifts. The Burmese force retired from Assam soon after. A year later, Badan Chandra Borphukan was assassinated and the Ahom king Chandrakanta Singha was deposed by rival political faction led by Ruchinath Burhagohain, the son of Purnananda Burhagohain . Chandrakanta Singha and the friends of Badan Chandra Borphukan appeal for help to Bodawpaya. In February 1819, the Burmese forces invaded Assam for second time and reinstalled Chandrakanta Singha on the throne of Assam.

Religion and culture

Bodawpaya proclaimed himself the next messianic Buddha or Maitreya (Arimittya), but his claim was firmly rejected by the Sangha. During his reign, scholarship flourished due to the discipline and stability achieved by establishing a chapter of Sangharajas or senior monks charged with the responsibility of safeguarding the purity of the Sangha. He had successfully arbitrated in favour of orthodoxy to cover both shoulders on the alms round in the controversy concerning the correct way of wearing the robes, and the Order of Monks was unified under the Thudhamma order. Burma became the custodian of Buddhism in the region, and the upasampada ordination was re-introduced to Sri Lanka where it established the Amarapura Nikaya.

In 1790 Bodawpaya began the construction of a gigantic stupa called Mantalagyi (Great Royal Stupa) at Mingun,  up the River Irrawaddy from Mandalay on the west bank. It was however never finished after a prophecy went round saying  Payagyi lè apyi that, moksoe thonnya kap – "Once the great pagoda has been wrought, the Moksoe dynasty will come to nought". An earthquake in 1838 left huge fissures in the structure, and also caused the heads of the two gigantic chinthes to fall into the river. There was also a gigantic 90 ton bell dedicated to the stupa called the Mingun Bell, cast between 1808 and 1810. It was the largest ringing bell in the world, when the larger bell in Moscow Kremlin, called the Tsar bell, broke, until the larger Bell of Good Luck was cast and first rung for the new year in 2000. During his reign Bodawpaya also proved to be a great patron of the performing arts; he appointed a minister called Thabin Wun, and established strict regulations by royal decree ( a meint daw). He also ordered a major economic survey of the kingdom in 1784.

Bodawpaya was succeeded after his death in 1819 by his grandson, Prince of Sagaing, who later became known as Bagyidaw. The Heir Apparent, father of Bagyidaw, had died in 1808.

Family
  at Ava, 1759, Queen (Ale-nandaw Mibura) Sri Maha Nandabhi Ratna Devi (d. 3 September 1789), née Men Lun Poo, daughter of the Maung Santhwun Myosarey.
  at Ava, 1760, Queen (Nammadaw Mibura Hkaung Gyi) Sri Pawara Maha Rajendra Mangala Ratna Devi (b. 1743; d. at Meengun, 24 February 1807), née Men Lun Me, daughter of the Sri Putra Chauka Lathaun Mhu, who had issue, three daughters.
  at Ava, 1760, Queen (Myauk-nandaw Mibura I) Sri Maha Chandrabhi Ratna Devi, Salin and Phaungdeen Myosa Mibura (b. 1745; d. at Amarapura, Mandalay, 1807), née Me Lun Thu, daughter of the Meen Wun, who had issue, two sons.
  Queen (Ale-nandaw Mibura) Sri Maha Nandabhi Ratna Devi, Zameedeen Myosa Mibura, née Men Lun Bhoung, raised to the rank and title of Ale-nandaw Mibura 1789, daughter of the "Allaum Mingdragyi King".
  ca. 1760, a daughter of a Secretary of a Cavalry Unit.
  at Ava, 1767, Raja Devi, Pegu Myosa Mibura (d. 1785), née Sao Sri Ang Hsung [Sao Nang Sri Aung Bon], eldest daughter of Kambawasa Mahavamsa Sao Myat Hsan Te [Sao Myat Thande], Saopha of Hsipaw, by his first wife, Nang Gam Kyaw. Shr had issue, one son.
  Shin Min Si (d. before 1782), daughter of Maung Pu, of Shunzet, north of Moksobo, who had issue, one son.
  before 1771, his half-sister, Princess Min Shwe Mhya, Sri Suriya Chandra Devi, Zindau Myosa Mibura (b. 1754), daughter of Sri Pawara Vijaya Nanda Jatha Maha Dharma Rajadhiraja Alaung Min Thaya Gyi Alaungpaya Aungjaya, King of Burma, by his sixth wife, Raja Mahay, Shin Shwe Kho Gyi, daughter of the Min Wun.
  before 1771 (div. before 1782) Kolottaw Shin Min Me (d. 1782).
  Shin Min Si (d. before 1782).
  (div. before 1782) Kolottaw Shin Phoung (d. 1791), Abahdoneo.
  Queen (Myauk-nandaw Mibura II) Sri Maha Ratna Devi, Men Nu, Princess of Kyaukmho, Tsampanogo and Badon 5 Yuwa Myosa Mibura (b. 1765; d. at Zeedo, Maungmo, 10 July 1812), received Badon 5 Yuwa in fief 31 May 1810, sister of Shwedaik Wun.
  his half-sister, Queen Men Nyo Mya, Sri Suriya Mala Devi, Peen Mibura, younger daughter of Sri Pawara Vijaya Nanda Jatha Maha Dharma Rajadhiraja Alaung Min Thaya Gyi Alaungpaya Aungjaya, King of Burma.
  Queen (Taungsaundaw-shwe-ye Mibura) Sri Maha Mangala Devi, Men Aung, Dellah and Denubya Myosa Mibura, a Shan lady.
  Queen (Myauk-shwe-ye Mibura or Yesaun) Sri Suriya Dharma Devi or Sri Maha Dharma Devi, Men Woot, Landaik, Hlaethal, Kama and Aniyeen Myosa Mibura (d. at Meengun, 1811), a Shan lady. Former wet nurse to King Sagaing.
  1781, Sri Tilaka Devi, Mongmit, Thanteban and Sagu Myosa Mibura (d. at Mengoon, 1795), daughter of the Saopha of Mongmit.
  ca. 1782, Myat Swa, Men Mauk, granddaughter of the King of Ayudhya (Siam), widow of a former king.
  ca. 1782, Princess Men Anbaing, daughter of the Emperor of Annam, widow of a former king.
  ca. 1782, Princess Men Theesa, daughter of the King of Ayudhya (Siam), widow of a former king.
  ca. 1782, Princess Kheetha, Men Akhwun, daughter of Prince of Ayudhya (Siam), widow of a former king.
  ca. 1782, Princess Men Chandra, daughter of the Yuvaraja of Manipur, widow of a former king.
  ca. 1782, Shin Min Few, daughter of a Burmese official, widow of a former king.
  ca. 1782, Shin Hooja, daughter of a Burmese official, widow of a former king.
  ca. 1782, Shin Nujathuwot, granddaughter of the Athy Wungyi, widow of a former king.
  ca. 1782, Shin Goung, daughter of a Burmese official, widow of a former king.
  ca. 1782, Princess Men Tafanbween (d. 1813), daughter of the King of Ayudhya (Siam), widow of a former king.
  ca. 1782, Princess Men Tara, daughter of the Great Deputy King of Ayudhya (Siam), widow of a former king.
  ca. 1782, Men Tara, daughter of the Saopha of Manlong, widow of a former king.
  ca. 1782, Princess Men Mala, daughter of the King of Ayudhya (Siam), widow of a former king.
  ca. 1782, Men Sandaya, widow of a former king.
  ca. 1782, Wunna, Men Zowool, granddaughter of the King of Ayudhya (Siam), widow of a former king.
  ca. 1782, Kalya, Men Thwolsa (d. 1815), granddaughter of the King of Ayudhya (Siam), widow of a former king.
  ca. 1782, Theetha, widow of a former king.
  ca. 1782, Mala, daughter of the Maharaja of Assam, widow of a former king.
  ca. 1782, Maing Bhoung, daughter of the Mainphoung ruler, widow of a former king.
  ca. 1782, a daughter of the Kyaingtung Sawbwa, widow of a former king.
  ca. 1782, Khu Jaya, widow of a former king.
  14 Aug 1782, a princess from Mongnawng.
  Sri Suriya Mangala Devi, Zoloop and Kanaung Myosa Mibura, sister of the Attee Wungyi.
  Sri Devi, Tegyeentan Yuwa Myosa Mibura, daughter of the Mogoung Sawbwa.
  Sri Nanda Mahay Sri, Hlaing Det Myosa Mibura (cre. 16 July 1787), previously Amyint Myosa Mibura.
  Mallavati, Shin Win Byu (d. 1788), daughter of the Zarup Wun.
  Kolottaw Shin Yaing (d. 1789), daughter of the Ngesanyun.
  at the Royal Palace, Amarapura, Mandalay, 20 October 1790, Queen (Anaukhan Mibura) Sri Maha Gandhara Devi (cre 20 October 1790), Taku Nyin (b. ca. 1775; d. 1815), elde daughter of Kyi Ta Law Ye, a Chinese lady supposedly the granddaughter of the Emperor of China.
  at the Royal Palace, Amarapura, Mandalay, 20 October 1790, Sri Maha Pinsala Devi (cre 20 October 1790), Aku Nyin (b. ca. 1776), sister of Taku Nyin, and second daughter of Kyi Ta Law Ye.
  at the Royal Palace, Amarapura, Mandalay, 20 October 1790, Sri Maha Gandha Chandra Devi (cre 20 October 1790), Tang Ku Nyin, Taungbaing Myosa Mibura (b. ca. 1777; d. 1838), sister of Taku Nyin, and younger daughter of Kyi Ta Law Ye.
  Men Meing (d. 1791), daughter of the Kyaungtung Sawbwa, widow of a former king.
  Sri Suriya Ratna Devi, Men Si Si, Meittila Myosa Mibura (d. at Mingun, 1793), granddaughter of King Maha Dharmaraja Adipati Hansawaddy Yauk Min Thaya Gyi, the la King of Ava.
  (div. 1794) Sri Mangala Mahay, Shin Min Bew, Danubyu Myosa Mibura (cre. 11 Aug 1783), daughter of the Daing Wun.
  Ketha, Shin Ye (d. 1795), daughter of the Rajawei Bo.
  at Amarapura, Mandalay, 6 July 1797 (div. 1817) Queen (Mogoung Mibura) Sri Maha Vimala Devi Champavati, Vesali Myosa Mibura, daughter of an Assamese jeweler presented by the Maharaja of Assam as his own daughter.
  at Amarapura, Mandalay, 4 March 1798, a bride from Nge Daung*.
  at Amarapura, Mandalay, 14 June 1798, a bride from Mong Sit*.
  at Amarapura, Mandalay, 20 December 1798, a bride from Vesali (Assam)*.
  at Amarapura, Mandalay, 20 December 1798, a second bride from Vesali (Assam)*.
  at Amarapura, Mandalay, 20 December 1798, athi bride from Vesali (Assam)*.
  at Amarapura, Mandalay, May 1801, Mi Tha, Apyadaw.
  Sri Vati, Shin Myat Thwu, Zalun Myosa Mibura (d. 1802), daughter of the Athy Wungyi.
  Shin Say, Chandravati, Naungan Myosa Mibura (d. 1805), daughter of the Shing Wun.
  Kolottaw Shin Min Hla, Sri Dhama (d. 1805), daughter of the Sri Shwe Daung.
  Sri Suriya Jaya Mahay, Zalun Myosa Mibura (d. 1806), daughter of Morren Iswara of Manipur.
  Anya, Shin Min (d. 1806), daughter of a junior official.
  Kolottaw Shin Thu, Thu Yali (d. 1806), daughter of the Kyaukse Sarey.
  at Amarapura, Mandalay, 11 April 1806, Mani Suriyavamsa Padma, Princess of Mong Tien (Mongtung?) (b. 1789).
  at Amarapura, Mandalay, 1806, a daughter of Ko Hse, Sawbwa of Chauk Taung*.
  Shin Myatt, Thu Dhama, Thebyehla Yuwasa (d. 1807), daughter of Min Du Si.
  at Amarapura, Mandalay, 10 April 1807, a bride from Manipur*.
  at Amarapura, Mandalay, 25 April 1807, another bride from Manipur*.
  at Amarapura, Mandalay, 8 May 1807, a daughter of the Chularaja of Manipur*.
  Sri Suriya Hema, Shin Du, Nebetkyo Yuwasa (d. 1808), daughter of a Burmese official.
  Kolottaw Shin Hnin Wu, Mangala Mahay (d. at Amarapura, Mandalay, before 7 December 1810), daughter of the Inma Thungyi.
  Sri Chandra Mahay Thee, Zenangyaung Myosa Mibura (d. 1813), daughter of the Ayudhya (Siam) Wun.
  Sri Suriya Moha, Shin Bwin, Manta Yuwasa (d. 1813), daughter of a Burmese official.
  at Amarapura, Mandalay, 29 May 1813, a bride from Mong Mao*.
  at Amarapura, Mandalay, 5 November 1814, another bride from Mong Mao*.
  Shin Mu, Sri Prabhavati, Hitseingyi Myosa Mibura, Thitseingyi Yuwasa (d. 1815), daughter of the Deva Shwe Daung.
  a daughter (d. 1815) of the Veedehee Raja, a Hindu.
  at Amarapura, Mandalay, 4 September 1815, a bride from Mong Pei*.
  at Amarapura, Mandalay, 4 September 1815, a bride from Mong Tei*.
  at Amarapura, Mandalay, 24 July 1816, another bride from Vesali (Assam)*.
  Sri Theinkha Mahay Thee, Sawhla Myosa Mibura, daughter of the Maharaja of Assam.
  Sri Ratna Mahay Thee, Shin Min Hla, Maddara Myosa Mibura, Thonze Myosa, daughter of the Sri Kyodoo or the Zorup Myosa.
  Sri Gusia Mahay, Pauk Mibura, Paun Myaing Myosa, former wife of King Singusa, and daughter of the Kaingma Sawbwa.
  Sri Wunna Mahay, Sawhla Myosa Mibura, daughter of the Saopha of Mongmit.
  Sri Mala Mahay, Naemhyagyi Myosa Mibura, Pyogyi Yuwasa, daughter of the Saopha of Mongnai.
  Sri Myat Swa Mahay, Katha Myosa Mibura (d. before 8 December 1825), daughter of the Mingyi Jayathu.
  Shin Min Pu, Sri Suriya Mangala, Zwabugyi Myosa Mibura, daughter of the Shwe Khun Mho.
  Sri Myat Mahay, Nanda, Theranka Myosa Mibura, daughter of the Saopha of Hsenwi.
  Kolottaw Shin Min Kyut, Sri Nanda, Moungtwin Yuwasa, daughter of the Shingkhedain Wun.
  Myat Swa Mahay, Shin Wu, Sri Suriya, Hlaethat Myosa Mibura (d. at Ratnapura, Mandalay, 1861).
  Kolottaw Shin Shwe Wu, Sri Mangala, daughter of a Burmese official.
  Kolottaw Shin Shwe, Nanda Sri, Lapo Yuwasa, daughter of Wudaing Sri Sithu.
  Thu Kela, Shin Min Bu, Shwegondaing Myosa Mibura, and Imbaung 5 Yuwasa (d. at Mandalay, 18 February 1892), daughter of a junior official.
  Kolottaw Shin Madhu, Antha Sri, daughter of the Ngekhwoe of Janggolo.
  Hema, Shin Young, daughter of the Ngetwei of Myethaya Street, Amarapura.
  Shin Mhoe Tha, Thu Tha Kha, Kanaungkain Yuwasa, daughter of Min Du Si.
  Thu Sita, Shin Wu Khya, Thebetshwe Yuwasa, daughter of Min Du Si.
  Sri Nanda, Thebe Myosa Mibura, previously Kolottaw Shin Min (d. 1859), daughter of the Natkan Min Si.
  Sri Chandra, Shin Bween, Shingazu Keensa.
  Dharma, Shin Nyeing, Myothit Kadousa.
  Thuya, Shin Koung, sister of Raja Kyothu.
  (div.) Sri Andara, Shin Gyi, Shwegun Yuwasa, daughter of the Wailoo Kyaw Htin.
  Kolottaw Mala, Shin Min Byew, daughter of the Sittaung Myothugyi.
  Mura, Shin Myat Mho, sister of the Laikha Kyaw Suriya.
  Sri Wunna, Shin Khwoe, daughter of the Meknan Wun.
  Kella, Kolottaw Shin Aung, a relation of the Maharaja of Manipur.
  Vaisa, Shin Hmin, a lady from Manipur.
  Khuja, Shin Da, a lady from Manipur.
  Gandha, Shin Yeik, a lady from Manipur.
  Shin Geing, a lady from Manipur.
  Shin Nindu, a lady from Manipur.
  Shin Hni Nya, a lady from Manipur.
  (div.) Thadha, Shin Min Da, daughter of the Tovey Tsikey.
  Nanda, Shin The Tha, Thegyi Yuwasa.
  Sri Suriya Chandra, Shin Da, daughter of the Dheenyawaddy Wun.
  Kolottaw Sri Suriya Kela, Shin Nyun, Kyauktalon Myosa Mibura, daughter of Amhaye.
  Shin Min Nyo, Sri Suriya Prabha, Legyi Yuwasa, daughter of a Siamese prince.
  Sri Thu Mutla, Shin Min Pu, Zeen, Yuwathidkee, and Pegwey Yuwasa, a relation of the King of Ayudhya (Siam).
  Ratna Sri, Shin Shwe Bween, Myaunghla Myosa Mibura, daughter of the Wungyi Sado Sri Maha Vijana.
  (div.) Sri Suriya Dharma, Shi Shwe Da, Samun Yuwasa, granddaughter of the Wungyi Sado Sri Maha Vijana.
  Sri Suriya Nanda, Sao Nang Hshin Sandi, daughter Sao Hsun Kung Hso Wai Hpa [Sao Hswe Hking or Kon Cheng], Saopha of Hsenwi.
  Sanda Sri, Sao Nang Hseng Santa, daughter of Sao Hsun Kung Hso Wai Hpa [Sao Hswe Hking or Kon Cheng], Saopha of Hsenwi.
  Sri Suriya Mala, Shin Shwe Kya, Kyaukyi Yuwasa, daughter of a soldier.
  Sri Suriya Ratna, Padaung Muni, Pyinzi Yuwasa (d. 1853), an Assamese, received Pyinzi in fief 11 November 1807.
  Sri Suriya Gandha, Zuppuri, Nyaungsauk Yuwasa, an Assamese.
  Sri Suriya Kella, Zibhadda, Thobo Yuwasa, an Assamese.
  (div.) Sri Suriya Sita, Shin Si, a merchant's daughter.
  Sri Suriya Wunna, Shin Min Byew, Shweginma Yuwasa, daughter of a merchant.
  Sri Suriya Kha, Shin Yung, Ngyun Yuwasa, daughter of a Burmese official.
  (div.) Sri Suriya Yinna, Shin Sa, daughter of a Burmese official.
  (div.) Sridiwatswa, Shin Pe, daughter of a Burmese official.
  Wunna Sri Suriya Varmakantha Shin Shwe, daughter of the Bharyo Sawbwa.
  Dharma Sri, daughter of the ruler of Champapathel.
  Mala Sri, Princess Dheinpiyanthi, daughter of the Maharaja of Manipur.
  Kotha Hla, daughter of the Saopha of Lawksawk.
  Men Pansa, daughter of the Maharaja of Manipur.
  Champavati, daughter of Mohnyin Sawbwa.
  the Thayaung Myosa Mibura, daughter of Shwedaungshin, Maha Thamada Raja, King of Arakan.
  Sri Suriya Padma, Muni Surivarna, daughter of the Saopha of Mongsit.
  another daughter of the Maharaja of Manipur.
  a daughter of the Moha Sing Raja of Manipur.
  a daughter of the Sandi Sawbwa.
  a daughter of the ruler of Khanti.
  a daughter of the Saopha of Longkeyin.
  a daughter of the ruler of Maingmo, "Theins lord" Tho Houng Phowa, a Shan.
  a granddaughter of the ruler of Maingmo, "Theins lord" Tho Houng Phowa, a Shan.
  a daughter of Boikanlasa Pownna Ming, a Brahmin.
  a daughter of the Thenggyi Raja, a Hindu.
  daughter of the Phema Sawbwa.
  Nanada Maha, daughter of the Mogong Sawbwa.
  Chandra Sri, daughter of the Saopha of Mong Nai.
  Jaya Sri, Shin Man, daughter of the Saopha of Singaling Hkamti (Zungsalen Sawbwa).
  Nutavati, Shin Aung Da, daughter of the Maingseit Bo.
  Sri Padma, Shin Min Da, a Burmese lady.
  Suriya Moutka, Shin Nyeing, daughter of the Akaukwun.
  Suriya Bhadda, Shin Wei, daughter of a Bo.
  Sri Bhad Da, Shin Min Hla, daughter of the Mahadanwun.
  Jaya Sri, Shin Min Gyi, daughter of the Bassein Wun.
  Suriya Mallah, Shin Yin, daughter of a commoner.
  Mala Sri, Shin Mu, daughter of the Anaukwun.
  Thuya Sri, Shin Min, daughter of the Norotka Mingyi.
  Ketha Sri, Shin Megna, daughter of the Shwe Daung Bollah.
  Sri Ratna, Shin Si, daughter of the Bassein Wun.
  Sri Ratna, Shin Khyeen, daughter of the Nakhara Kyoswa Norotka.
  Suriya Anya, Shin Amma, daughter of an official of the Ming Raja.
  Ketha, Shin Wu, daughter of a Burmese official.
  Suriya Chandra, Sjin Khu, daughter of the Meindoung Wun.
  Suriya Anya, Shin Amma, daughter of Yathey.
  Suriya Danda, Shin Mat Few, daughter of the Kaunghan Sarey.
  Mala, Shin Min Byew, daughter of a Burmese official.
  Sri Chandra, Shin Min Du, daughter of the Myowun.
  Meyu Sri, Shin Min Hla, daughter of the Legain Bo.
  Suriya Wunna, Shin Poung, daughter of Ngethwa, a commoner.
  Theing Kha, Shin Khey, daughter of an official from Maenda Keensa.
  Theing Kha, Shin Du, daughter of the Taingda Myosa.
  Suruya, Shin Khwoe, daughter of the Pagan Saregyi.
  Hema, Shin Kyi, daughter of a Thagwei.
  Bhadda, Shin Khua, daughter of a Burmese commoner.
  Leinya, Shin Min Byew, daughter of a Burmese butler.
  Kolottaw Neelabha, Shin Jan, a Burmese.
  Sita, Shin Ye, daughter of Minsi.
  Tha Kha, Shin Min Hla, daughter of a Burmese commoner.
  Ella, Shin Su, daughter of a Burmese commoner.
  Danda, Shin Wu, daughter of a Burmese commoner.
  Dha Oumma, Shin Min, daughter of the Hee Wun.
  Yuja, Shin Aung, daughter of a Burmese commoner.
  Nwei Tha, Shin Min Thowei, daughter of a Burmese commoner.
  Hlan Tha, Shin Min Thwun, daughter of Bo Jaya Norotka.
  Dan Tha, Shin Aim Thu, daughter of an official of the Sita Raja.
  Mala Sri, Shin Min Aung, daughter of a Burmese official.
  Sri Thuya, Shin Mya Yout, daughter of the Crown Prince's Saregyi.
  Sri Mala, Shin Nhoung, granddaughter of Myin Wungyi.
  Suriya Nandi, Shin Khe Nyo, daughter of a junior official.
  Suriya Muddi, Shin Khe Kew, daughter of a merchant.
  Thaddha, Shin Gu, daughter of the Min Wun.
  Thaddha, Shin Pu, daughter of Talkey.
  Dharma, Shin Thuya, daughter of a Burmese official.
  Nanda, Shin Hnin.
  Chandra, Shin Min Pu, a Martabanese from Salain.
  Suriya Kalyani, Shin Min.
  Thein Na, Shin Khwoe.
  Sri, Shin Khoung.
  Prabha, Shin Yin.
  Ketha, Shin Pan Wu.
  Mala, Shin Pan Yi.
  Hama, Shin Thu.

References

Bibliography

 
 Koenig, William J. "The Burmese Polity, 1752–1819: Politics, Administration, and Social Organization in the early Kon-baung Period", Michigan Papers on South and Southeast Asia, Number 34, 1990.
 Lieberman, Victor B. " Political Consolidation in Burma Under the Early Konbaung Dynasty, 1752-c. 1820." Journal of Asia History 30.2 (1996): 152–168.

External links
 Wanderings in Burma by George W Bird, 1897 F J Bright & Son, London, pp 316A, 318, 318A, 320A inc. old photos of Mingun by Signor Beaton of Mandalay

Konbaung dynasty
1745 births
1819 deaths
19th-century Burmese monarchs
18th-century Burmese monarchs